Nuisance wildlife management is the selective removal of problem individuals or populations of specific species of wildlife. Other terms for the field include wildlife damage management, wildlife control, and animal damage control. Some wild animal species may get used to human presence, causing property damage or risking the transfer of diseases (zoonoses) to humans or pets. Many wildlife species coexist with humans very successfully, such as commensal rodents which have become more or less dependent on humans.

Common nuisance species 
Wild animals that can cause problems in homes, gardens or yards include armadillos, skunks, boars, foxes, squirrels, snakes, rats, groundhogs, beavers, opossums, raccoons, bats, moles, deer, mice, coyotes, bears, ravens, seagulls, woodpeckers and pigeons. In the United States, some of these species are protected, such as bears, ravens, bats, deer, woodpeckers, and coyotes, and a permit may be required to control some species.

Conflicts between people and wildlife arise in certain situations, such as when an animal's population becomes too large for a particular area to support. Human-induced changes in the environment will often result in increased numbers of a species. For example, piles of scrap building material make excellent sites where rodents can nest. Food left out for household pets is often equally attractive to some wildlife species. In these situations, the wildlife have suitable food and habitat and may become a nuisance.

The Humane Society of the United States (HSUS) provides strategies for the control of species such as bats, bears, chipmunks, coyotes, deer, mice, racoons and snakes.

Control methods

The most commonly used methods for controlling nuisance wildlife around homes and gardens include exclusion, habitat modification, repellents, toxic baits, glue boards, traps and frightening.

Exclusion

Exclusion techniques refer to the act of sealing a home to prevent wildlife; such as, rodents (squirrels, rats, mice) and bats from entering it. A common practice is to seal up areas that wildlife gain access to; such as an attic where animals might shelter to be free from the elements and predators.

Exclusion techniques can be done by Nuisance Wildlife Control companies, who may have expert knowledge of local wildlife and their behaviors. The techniques include sealing a house's construction (builders) gap, soffit returns, gable vents, pipe chases, utility chases, vents, siding trim gap, with rustproof material that animals can't easily gnaw through, usually steel wool.

In regards to outdoor exclusions, physically excluding an offending animal from the area being damaged or disturbed is often the best and most permanent way to control the problem. Depending upon size of the area to be protected, this control method can range from inexpensive to costly.

For example, damage by birds or rabbits to ornamental shrubs or garden plants can be reduced inexpensively by placing bird netting over the plants to keep the pests away. On the other hand, fencing out deer from a lawn or garden can be more costly. Materials needed for exclusion will depend upon the species causing the problem. Large mammals can be excluded with woven wire fences, poly-tape fences, and electric fences; but many communities forbid the use of electric fencing in their jurisdictions. Small mammals and some birds can be excluded with netting, tarp, hardware cloth or any other suitable material; nets come in different weave sizes suitable for different animals to be excluded.

However, exclusion techniques can interfere with the natural movement of wildlife, particularly when exclusion covers large areas of land.

Habitat modification
Modifying an animal’s habitat often provides lasting and cost-effective relief from damage caused by nuisance wildlife. Habitat modification is effective because it limits access to one or more of the requirements for life – food, water or shelter. However, habitat modification, while limiting nuisance wildlife, may also limit desirable species such as songbirds as well.

Rodent- or bat-proofing buildings by sealing cracks and holes prevents these animals from gaining access to suitable habitats where they are not welcome. Storing seed and pet food in tightly closed containers, controlling weeds and garden debris around homes and buildings, and storing firewood and building supplies on racks or pallets above ground level are also practices that can limit or remove the animals’ sources of food, water or shelter.

Repellents
Using a repellent that changes the behavior of an animal may lead to a reduction or elimination of damage. Several available repellents, such as objectionable-tasting coatings or odor repellents may deter wildlife from feeding on plants. Other repellents such as sticky, tacky substances placed on or near windows, trees or buildings may deter many birds and small mammals. Unfortunately, most wildlife soon discover that repellents are not actually harmful, and the animals may quickly become accustomed to the smell, taste or feel of these deterrents.

Chemical repellents applied outdoors will have to be reapplied due to rain or heavy dew, or applied often to new plant growth to be effective.  Failure to carefully follow the directions included with repellents can drastically diminish the effectiveness of the product. Some repellents contain toxic chemicals, such as paradichlorobenzene, and are ineffective unless used at hazardous concentrations.  Other more natural repellents contain chili pepper or capsaicin extracted from hot peppers.

However, even under the best of conditions, repellents frequently fail to live up to user expectations. The reason for this is twofold. First, many repellents simply don't work. For example, peer-reviewed publications have consistently shown that ultrasonic devices do not drive unwanted animals away. Second, even when the repellent has been shown to work, animals in dire need of food will "hold their nose" and eat anyway because the alternative is essentially death by starvation. Repellents are most successful (referring to products actually demonstrated by peer-reviewed research to be effective) when animals have access to alternative food sources in a different location.

Glue traps and boards
Glue traps and boards can be either a lethal or non-lethal method of control. Glue boards can be used to trap small mammals and snakes. Applying vegetable oil will dissolve the glue, allowing for release, but caution must be taken to avoid scratches and bites from the trapped animal. Glue boards are often used to remove rodents, but they don’t solve the rodent wildlife problem. In order to control rodent populations, solutions must focus on the removal of the cause and source.

Live trapping
Using traps can be very effective in reducing actual population numbers of certain species. However, many species cannot be trapped without a permit. In most cases, homeowners may trap an offending animal within 100 yards of their residence without a permit, however relocation is often illegal.

Traditional live traps such as cage or box traps are easily purchased at most garden centers or hardware stores. These traps allow for safe release of the trapped animal. The release of the animal to another area may be prohibited by state law, or may be regulated by the local Department of Fish and Game. Leghold traps may allow for either release or euthanasia of the trapped animal. Traps such as body-gripping traps, scissor and harpoon traps, as well as rat/mouse snap traps, are nearly always lethal. Knowledge of animal behavior, trapping techniques, and baits is essential for a successful trapping program.(Bornheimer, Shane P. "PreferredWildlifeservices.com" July 2013)

Hazing devices
Hazing devices such as bells, whistles, horns, clappers, sonic emitters, audio tapes and other sound devices may be quite successful in the short term for repelling an animal from an area. Other objects such as effigies, lights, reflectors and windmills rely on visual stimulation to scare a problem animal away. Often nuisance animals become accustomed to these tactics, and will return later if exposed to these devices daily.

Sonic nets
In 2013, Dr. John Swaddle and Dr. Mark Hinders at the College of William and Mary created a new method of deterring birds and other animals using benign sounds projected by conventional and directional (parametric) speakers.  The initial objectives of the technology were to displace problematic birds from airfields to reduce bird strike risks, minimize agricultural losses due to pest bird foraging, displace nuisance birds that cause extensive repair and chronic clean-up costs, and reduce bird mortality from flying into man-made structures.   The sounds, referred to as a “Sonic Net,” do not have to be loud and are a combination of wave forms - collectively called "colored" noise - forming non-constructive and constructive interference with how birds and other animals such as deer talk to each other. Technically, the Sonic Nets technology is not a bird or wildlife scarer, but discourages birds and animals from going into or spending time in the target area.  The impact to the animals is similar to talking in a crowded room, and since they cannot understand each other they go somewhere else.  Early tests at an aviary and initial field trials at a landfill and airfield indicate that the technology is effective and that birds do not habituate to the sound.  The provisional and full patents were filed in 2013 and 2014 respectively, and further research and commercialization of the technology are ongoing.

See also
Animal trapping
Culling
Electrical disruptions caused by squirrels
Emu War
Goose egg addling
List of government animal eradication programs
Pest control
Tree squirrel
Wildlife management

References

Further reading 
National Wildlife Control Operators Association.
www.nwcoa.org. is an experimental website of the National Wildlife Control Operators Association based on the wordpress platform and may or may not contain correct information regarding the association.
Prevention and Control of Wildlife Damage. Editors, Scott E. Hygnstrom, Robert M. Timm, Gary E. Larson. 1994. University of Nebraska-Lincoln. 2 vols. Available for free

External links 
 The National Wildlife Control Operators Association The association is organized exclusively as a mutual benefit non-profit trade association to assist persons or organizations providing commercial wildlife damage management and control activities. The association shall be active in training, educating and promoting competence, service and integrity to the members of the wildlife damage management industry.
 The Internet Center for Wildlife Damage Management Research collections
 National Wildlife Research Center Fort Collins, CO  Staff publications
Software NWCOPRO is an industry specific software dedicated to the business management of nuisance wildlife control operators.

Conservation biology
Ecology
Pests (organism)
Garden pests
Habitat
Wildlife